Joseph R. Driscoll is an American politician who was a member of the Massachusetts House of Representatives from 2003 to 2011, representing the 5th district of Norfolk County.

Public life
Driscoll was elected to the Massachusetts House of Representatives in 2003.  Before being elected to this seat, he started his legal career prosecuting criminal cases in the Middlesex County District Attorney's Office. From there, he became an Assistant District Attorney in Norfolk County under District Attorney William R. Keating. In this capacity, Driscoll led the Sexual Assault and Child Abuse Unit where he was responsible for trying such cases and working with key witnesses, including children. Driscoll was then appointed Assistant Attorney General assigned to the Medicaid Fraud Control Unit, a division dedicated to protecting the elderly from fraud and abuse. He handled high profile Superior Court cases including attempted murder, armed robbery, domestic violence and child abuse cases.

Driscoll represented the town of Braintree, precinct one of the town of Holbrook, and precinct three of the town of Randolph in the Massachusetts House of Representatives. After a hard fought campaign for Norfolk County District Attorney, his term ended in January 2011 and he was succeeded by Mark Cusack also of Braintree.

Affiliations
 Boston Bar Association
 Norfolk County Bar Association
 Supreme Judicial Court Historical
 Knights of Columbus Council 1462
 Braintree Historical Society
 East Braintree Civic Association

Committees
 Joint Committee on Ways & Means
 Joint Committee on Financial Services
 Joint Committee on Revenue

References

External links
 Massachusetts State Legislature
 Town's web site
 YouTube Page
 Facebook Page
 Private Practice

|-

|-

|-

|-

|-

1970 births
Living people
Boston College alumni
New England Law Boston alumni
Harvard Kennedy School alumni
Politicians from Braintree, Massachusetts
Democratic Party members of the Massachusetts House of Representatives